is a train station in Nakagyō-ku ward, city of Kyoto, Kyoto Prefecture, Japan.

Lines
  
  (Station Number: T14)

Layout
The underground station has an island platform with two tracks.

Ridership

Surrounding area
 Nijō Castle
 Shinsenen Garden
 Mikane Shrine
 Takenobu Inari Jinja
Horikawa Street
Oike Street

References

Railway stations in Kyoto Prefecture